The Ed Rand House, located in Baker City, Oregon, is a house listed on the National Register of Historic Places, designed by the architect Ed Rand.

See also
 National Register of Historic Places listings in Baker County, Oregon

References

1909 establishments in Oregon
Buildings and structures in Baker City, Oregon
Bungalow architecture in Oregon
Houses completed in 1909
Houses in Baker County, Oregon
Houses on the National Register of Historic Places in Oregon
National Register of Historic Places in Baker County, Oregon